The Wisconsin Badgers women's ice hockey program represented the University of Wisconsin during the 2013–14 NCAA Division I women's ice hockey season. Goaltender Alex Rigsby graduated as the program’s all-time leader in wins with 100, minutes played with 7,881:09 and saves with 3,126. Of note, her .941 save percentage is tied for first in program history. A 3-1 victory over Bemidji State helped Rigsby surpass Jessie Vetter for the Badgers mark in career wins.
In the postseason, the Badgers were defeated 1-0 in the WCHA Final Face-off against the North Dakota Fighting Sioux. Despite the loss, the Badgers would qualify for the NCAA tournament, their seventh in program history. In the quarterfinals, the Badgers defeated Harvard by a 2-1 mark at LaBahn Arena. Advancing to the Frozen Four in Hamden, Connecticut, the Lakers were bested by WCHA rival Minnesota in a 5-3 loss on March 21.

Offseason

Recruiting

Exhibition

Regular season
February 15, 2014: Competing against the Minnesota Golden Gophers, the two programs set an NCAA women’s hockey attendance record by competing in front of 13,573 fans.

Postseason

WCHA Playoffs

NCAA tournament

Awards and honors
Alex Rigsby, 2014 Wisconsin Badgers Female Athlete of the Year
Alex Rigsby, 2014 AHCA first-team All-American
Alex Rigsby, 2014 WCHA Scholar-Athlete
Alex Rigsby, 2014 All-WCHA Academic team
Alex Rigsby, 2014 first-team All-WCHA 
Alex Rigsby, 2014 All-USCHO first team.

References

Wisconsin
Wisconsin Badgers women's ice hockey seasons
NCAA women's ice hockey Frozen Four seasons
Wisc
Wiscon
Wiscon